Precious TV is a private Christian television station in Ghana. It is owned and operated by Perez Chapel International.

References

External links

Television stations in Ghana